Making the Video is an MTV show, consisting of half-hour episodes, which chronicles the process of filming various music videos. Usually the director outlines the concept of the video (or treatment) and the show often includes light-hearted and humorous moments. It always concludes with a premiere of the finished video. The show premiered on June 28, 1999 and ended in 2010.

MTV2 aired a similar show entitled [Name of Band/Artist] Makes a Video that featured artists such as 50 Cent, Fall Out Boy, Dashboard Confessional, Evanescence, and Mos Def among others.

Season 1
 98 Degrees - "I Do (Cherish You)" (1999)
 Britney Spears - "(You Drive Me) Crazy" (1999)
 LL Cool J - "Deepest Bluest" (1999)
 Jordan Knight - "I Could Never Take the Place of Your Man" (1999)
 Jennifer Lopez - "Waiting for Tonight" (1999)
 Jay-Z - "Girl's Best Friend" (1999)
 Jewel - "Jupiter (Swallow the Moon)" (1999)
 Blink-182 - "All The Small Things" (1999)
 Mariah Carey - "Heartbreaker" (1999)
 Chris Cornell - "Can't Change Me" (1999)
 Puff Daddy featuring R. Kelly - "Satisfy You" (1999)
 The Offspring - "She's Got Issues" (1999)
 Red Hot Chili Peppers - "Around The World" (1999)
 Sugar Ray - "Falls Apart" (1999)
 Garbage - "The World Is Not Enough" (1999)
 Enrique Iglesias - "Rhythm Divine" (1999)
 Whitney Houston - "I Learned From the Best" (1999)
 R.E.M. - "The Great Beyond" (1999)

Season 2
 Dr. Dre featuring Eminem - "Forgot About Dre" (2000)
 *NSYNC - "Bye Bye Bye" (2000)
 Sisqo - "Thong Song" (2000)
 Mandy Moore - "Walk Me Home" (2000)
 Hanson - "This Time Around" (2000)
 Jay-Z - "Big Pimpin'" (2000)
 No Doubt - "Ex-Girlfriend" (2000)
 Da Brat featuring Tyrese - "What'chu Like" (2000)
 Jessica Simpson featuring Nick Lachey - "Where You Are" (2000)
 Stone Temple Pilots - "Sour Girl" (2000)
 Beck - "Mixed Bizness" (2000)
 Christina Aguilera - "I Turn To You" (2000)
 Britney Spears - "Oops...I Did It Again" (2000)
 Kid Rock - "American Bad Ass" (2000)
 Eminem - "The Real Slim Shady" (2000)
 Foo Fighters - "Breakout" (2000)
 Metallica - "I Disappear" (2000)
 *NSYNC - "It's Gonna Be Me" (2000)

Season 3
 Janet Jackson - "Doesn't Really Matter" (2000)
 LL Cool J - "Imagine That" (2000)
 Britney Spears - "Lucky" (2000)
 Busta Rhymes - "Fire" (2000)
 Big Tymers - "#1 Stunna" (2000)
 98 Degrees - "Give Me Just One Night" (2000)
 Christina Aguilera - "Come on over Baby (All I Want Is You)" (2000)
 2gether - "The Hardest Part Of Breaking Up" (2000)
 Lenny Kravitz - "Again" (2000)
 Destiny's Child - "Independent Women Pt. 1" (2000)
 Ricky Martin - "She Bangs" (2000)
 Backstreet Boys - "Shape of My Heart" (2000)
 Blink-182 - "Man Overboard" (2000)
 OutKast - "Ms. Jackson" (2000)
 Britney Spears - "Stronger" (2000)
 BBMak - "Still On Your Side" (2000)
 Jennifer Lopez - "Love Don't Cost a Thing" (2000)

Season 4
 Ricky Martin featuring Christina Aguilera - "Nobody Wants to Be Lonely" (2001)
 Snoop Dogg - "Lay Low" (2001)
 Eve - "Who's That Girl?" (2001)
 The Jackson 5 - "La-La Means I Love You (snippet)" - with a cameo appearance by Rob Thomas from Matchbox Twenty (2001)
 Aerosmith - "Jaded" (2001)
 Matchbox Twenty - "Mad Season" (2001)
 Destiny's Child - "Survivor" (2001)
 Jay-Z featuring R. Kelly - "Guilty Until Proven Innocent"/"Fiesta" (2001)
 Dream - "This Is Me"/Tyrese - "I Like Them Girls" (2001)

Season 5
 Christina Aguilera, Lil' Kim, Mýa, & Pink - "Lady Marmalade" (2001)
 Baha Men - "Best Years of Our Lives" (2001)
 U2 - "Elevation" (2001)
 *NSYNC - "Pop" (2001)
 Destiny's Child - "Bootylicious" (2001)
 Sisqo - "Can I Live" (2001)
 Jennifer Lopez featuring Ja Rule - "I'm Real (Murder Remix)" (2001)
 Ludacris featuring Nate Dogg - "Area Codes" (2001)

Season 6
 Britney Spears - "I'm a Slave 4 U" (2001)
 On the Line All-Stars - "On the Line" (2001)
 P. Diddy - "Diddy" (2001)
 Janet Jackson - "Son of a Gun (I Betcha Think This Song Is about You)" (2001)
 P!nk - "Get The Party Started" (2001)

Season 7
 No Doubt - "Hey Baby" (2001)
 Ja Rule featuring Ashanti - "Always On Time" (2001)
 Creed - "My Sacrifice" (2001)
 Kid Rock - "Forever" (2001)
 Marilyn Manson - "Tainted Love" (2001)

Season 8
 Nick Cannon, Lil' Romeo, & 3LW - "Parents Just Don't Understand" (2001)
 Britney Spears - "I'm Not A Girl, Not Yet A Woman" (2001)
 Foo Fighters - "The One" (2001)
 Enrique Iglesias - "Escape" (2002)
 Brandy - "What About Us?" (2002)
 Shakira - "Underneath Your Clothes" (2002)
 P!nk - "Don't Let Me Get Me" (2002)
 Usher featuring Ludacris - "U Don't Have To Call" (2002)
 Godsmack - "I Stand Alone" (2002)
 No Doubt - "Hella Good" (2002)

Season 9
 Sum 41 - "It's What We're All About" (2002)
 Puddle of Mudd - "Drift & Die" (2002)
 P.O.D. - "Boom" (2002)
 Eminem - "Without Me" (2002)
 P. Diddy featuring Loon, Ginuwine & Mario Winans - "I Need A Girl Pt. 2" (2002)
 Jennifer Lopez featuring Nas - "I'm Gonna Be Alright" (2002)
 Papa Roach - "She Loves Me Not" (2002)
R. Kelly- "Ignition Remix" (2002)
 Nelly - "Hot In Herre" (2002)
 Will Smith - "Nod Ya Head" (2002)
 Beyoncé - "Work It Out" (2002)
 Kelly Osbourne - "Papa Don't Preach" (2002)
 Eve featuring Alicia Keys - "Gangsta Lovin'" (2002)
 Jennifer Love Hewitt - "BareNaked" (2002)
 Shakira - "Objection (Tango)" (2002)
 Michelle Branch - "Goodbye To You" (2002)
 Jimmy Fallon - "Idiot Boyfriend" (2002)
 Lil' Bow Wow, Lil Wayne, Lil' Zane, & Sammie - "Hardball" (2002)
 Avril Lavigne - "Sk8er Boi" (2002)
 Justin Timberlake - "Like I Love You" (2002)
 Nick Carter - "Help Me" (2002)
 Kelly Clarkson - "Before Your Love" (2002)
 Christina Aguilera featuring Redman - "Dirrty" (2002)
 Madonna - "Die Another Day" (2002)
 Missy Elliott - "Work It" (2002)
 Jennifer Lopez - "Jenny from the Block" (2002)

Season 10
 Good Charlotte - "The Anthem" (2003)
 Mariah Carey featuring Cam'ron - "Boy (I Need You)" (2003)
 DMX - "X Gon' Give It to Ya" (2003)
 Justin Timberlake - "Rock Your Body" (2003)
 Linkin Park - "Somewhere I Belong" (2003)
 Avril Lavigne - "Losing Grip" (2003)
 Jennifer Lopez - "I'm Glad" (2003)
 Christina Aguilera - "Fighter" (2003)
 Ludacris - "Act a Fool" (2003)
 Pink - "Feel Good Time" (2003)
 Beyoncé featuring Jay-Z - "Crazy In Love" (2003)
 Mýa - "My Love Is Like...Wo!" (2003)
 Ruben Studdard - "Flying Without Wings" (2003)
 Madonna - "Hollywood" (2003)
 Nelly featuring Murphy Lee & P. Diddy - "Shake Ya Tailfeather" (2003)
 Jessica Simpson - "Sweetest Sin"/ Nick Lachey - "Shut Up"
 Mary J. Blige - "Love @ 1st Sight" (2003)
 Hilary Duff - "So Yesterday" (2003)
 Beyoncé, Missy Elliott, MC Lyte & Free - "Fighting Temptation"
 Da Band - "Bad Boy This, Bad Boy That" (2003)
 Pink - "Trouble" (2003)
 Limp Bizkit - "Behind Blue Eyes" (2003)
 Britney Spears featuring Madonna - "Me Against The Music" (2003)
 Blink-182 - "Feeling This" (2003)
 Mary J. Blige featuring Eve - "Not Today" (2003)
 Triumph the Insult Comic Dog - "I Keed" (2003)
 Puddle of Mudd - "Away from Me" (2003)

Season 11
 Hilary Duff - "Come Clean" (2004)
 Chingy featuring Jason Weaver - "One Call Away" (2004)
 Britney Spears - "Toxic" (2004)
 D12 - "My Band" (2004)
 Jessica Simpson - "Take My Breath Away" (2004)
 Jay-Z - "99 Problems" (2004)
 Brandy featuring Kanye West - "Talk About Our Love" (2004)
 Yellowcard - "Only One" (2004)
 Hilary Duff & Haylie Duff - "Our Lips Are Sealed" (2004)
 Usher - "Confessions Part II" (2004)
 Mase - "Welcome Back" (2004)
 Nelly - "Flap Your Wings"/Nelly featuring Jaheim - "My Place" (2004)
 Green Day - "American Idiot" (2004)
 Good Charlotte - "Predictable" (2004)
 Ja Rule featuring R. Kelly & Ashanti - "Wonderful" (2004)
 Xzibit - "Hey Now (Mean Muggin)" (2004)
 Eminem - "Just Lose It" (2004)
 Lindsay Lohan - "Rumors" (2004)
 Nelly featuring Christina Aguilera - "Tilt Ya Head Back" (2004)
 Gwen Stefani - "What You Waiting For?" (2004)
 Ashlee Simpson - "La La" (2004)
 Jennifer Lopez - "Get Right" (2005)
 Twista featuring Faith Evans - "Hope" (2005)
 Snoop Dogg - "Let's Get Blown" (2005)

Season 12
 50 Cent featuring Olivia - "Candy Shop" (2005)
 Eminem - "Ass Like That" (2005)
 Mariah Carey - "It's Like That" (2005)
 Snoop Dogg, Charlie Wilson & Justin Timberlake - "Signs" (2005)
 Nelly - "Errtime" (2005)
 Kelly Osbourne - "One Word" (2005)
 Shakira featuring Alejandro Sanz - "La Tortura" (2005)
 The Game - "Dreams" (2005)
 Ludacris featuring Bobby Valentino - "Pimpin' All Over the World" (2005)
 Foo Fighters - "Best of You" (2005)
 Jessica Simpson - "These Boots Are Made For Walkin'" (2005)
 Ashlee Simpson - "Boyfriend" (2005)
 50 Cent - "Window Shopper" (2005)
 Lindsay Lohan - "Confessions Of A Broken Heart (Daughter To Father)" (2005)
 Shakira - "Don't Bother" (2005)
 Jamie Foxx - "Unpredictable" (2005)
 KoЯn - "Twisted Transistor" (2005)
 Kanye West featuring Adam Levine - "Heard 'Em Say" (2005)
 Beyoncé featuring Slim Thug - "Check On It" (2005)

Season 13
 The Notorious B.I.G. - "Spit Your Game" featuring Twista, Krayzie Bone, and 8Ball & MJG (2006)
 Daddy Yankee - "Gangsta Zone" (2006)
 Fall Out Boy - "A Little Less Sixteen Candles, A Little More "Touch Me"" (2006)
 Nick Lachey - "What's Left Of Me" (2006)
 T.I. - "Why You Wanna" (2006)
 Ashlee Simpson - "Invisible" (2006)
 Christina Aguilera - "Ain't No Other Man" (2006)
 Jessica Simpson - "A Public Affair" (2006)
 Justin Timberlake - "SexyBack" (2006)
 Janet Jackson featuring Nelly - "Call On Me" (2006)
 Danity Kane - "Show Stopper" (2006)
 Ludacris featuring Pharrell - "Money Maker" (2006)
 Chris Cornell - "You Know My Name" (2006)
 Diddy - "Tell Me" featuring Christina Aguilera (2006)
 Gwen Stefani - "Wind It Up" (2006)
 Beyoncé - "Listen" (2006)

Season 14
 Nelly Furtado - "Maneater" (2007)
 Jennifer Lopez - "Que Hiciste" (2007)
 Natasha Bedingfield - "I Wanna Have Your Babies" (2007)
 Rihanna - "Shut Up and Drive" (2007)
 Foo Fighters - "The Pretender" (2007)
 Avril Lavigne - "Hot" (2007)
 Mariah Carey - "Touch My Body" (2008)
 Usher - "Love in This Club" (2008)
  Bon Jovi - "Whole Lot Of Leavin'" (2008)
  Natasha Bedingfield - "Pocketful of Sunshine" (2008)
  Lily Allen - "The Fear" (2009)
  Ashley Tisdale - "It's Alright, It's OK" (2009)
  Katy Perry, Snoop Dogg - "California Gurls" (2010)

Previous ...Makes a Video episodes

2004
 Akon - "Ghetto" (2004)
 Kanye West - "All Falls Down" (2004)
 Lil' Jon & The Eastside Boyz featuring Ice Cube - "Roll Call" (2004/early 2005)
 Linkin Park - "Breaking the Habit" (2004)
 Mobb Deep - "Got It Twisted" (2004)
 N.O.R.E. - "Oye Mi Canto"

2005
 50 Cent featuring Mobb Deep - "Outta Control (Remix)" (2005)
 Boyz n da Hood - "Felonies" (2005)
 Cassidy - "I'm A Hustla" (2005)
 Ciara - "Oh" featuring Ludacris
 Common - "The Corner"
 Common - "Testify"
 Daddy Yankee - "Rompe"
 Eminem - "Ass Like That" (entitled "Eminem's Making The Ass" rather than "Eminem Makes A Video", but is considered a ...Makes a Video episode)
 Green Day - "Boulevard of Broken Dreams"
 Green Day - "Wake Me Up When September Ends"
 J-Kwon featuring Petey Pablo - "Get XXX'd" (2005)
 Jim Jones featuring P. Diddy, Jha Jha & Paul Wall - "What You Been Drankin' On" (2005)
 Juelz Santana - "Oh Yes"/"Clockwork"
 Lil Wayne - "Fireman" (2005)
 Ludacris featuring Field Mob - "Georgia" (2005)
 Memphis Bleek - "Like That"
 Mike Jones "Back Then" (2005)
 Mike Jones "Flossin'"/"Screw Dat" (2005)
 Mobb Deep featuring 50 Cent - "Have A Party" (2005)
 Paul Wall - "Sittin' Sidewayz" (2005)
 R. Kelly - "Playa's Only" featuring The Game (2005)
 R. Kelly - "Trapped In The Closet (Chapter 6)"
 T.I. - "ASAP/Motivation" (2005)
 Twista featuring Pitbull - "Hit The Floor" (2005)
 Ying Yang Twins - "Wait (The Whisper Song)" (2005)
 Ying Yang Twins - "Shake" featuring Pitbull
 Young Jeezy - "Trapstar"/"Go Crazy" (2005)

2006
 50 Cent featuring Olivia - "Best Friend (Remix)" (2006)
 Cam'ron - "Touch It or Not"/"Wet Wipes" (2006)
 Dem Franchize Boyz - "Ridin' Rims" (2006)
 DJ Khaled - "Grammy Family" featuring Kanye West, Consequence, and John Legend
 DJ Khaled - "Holla At Me" featuring Lil Wayne, Paul Wall, Fat Joe, Rick Ross and Pitbull (2006)
 E-40 - "Tell Me When To Go" (2006)
 The Game - Let's Ride
 Ghostface Killah featuring Ne-Yo - "Back Like That" (2006)
 Ice Cube - "Go to Church" featuring Snoop Dogg and Lil' Jon (2006)
 Jim Jones - "We Fly High"
 Juvenile featuring Mike Jones, Paul Wall, Skip and Wacko - "Way I Be Leanin'"
 Lil' Jon featuring E-40 and Sean Paul - "Snap Ya Fingers" (2006)
 Lil' Scrappy featuring Young Buck - "Money In The Bank" (2006)
 Lil Wayne featuring Robin Thicke - "Shooter" (2006)
 Lupe Fiasco - "I Gotcha" (2006)
 Sleepy Brown featuring Pharrell & Big Boi - "Margarita" (2006)
 Snoop Dogg featuring R. Kelly - "That's That"
 T.I. featuring UGK - "Front Back"
 Three 6 Mafia - "Poppin' My Collar" (2006)
 Xzibit - "Concentrate"
 Yung Joc - "I Know You See It"/"Dope Boy Magic" (2006)

2009
 Eminem - "We Made You" (2009)
 Shakira - "She Wolf" (2009)

2011
 Katy Perry - "The One That Got Away" (2011)

External links
 MTV: Making the Video
 TV.com: Making the Video

MTV original programming
1999 American television series debuts
1990s American music television series
2000s American music television series
2010s American music television series
English-language television shows